Erythrostemon is a genus of flowering plants in the legume family, Fabaceae. Its native range is tropical & subtropical America.

Species
Erythrostemon comprises the following species:
 Erythrostemon acapulcensis (Standl.) E. Gagnon & G. P. Lewis
 Erythrostemon angulatus (Hook. & Arn.) E. Gagnon & G. P. Lewis
 Erythrostemon argentinus (Burkart) E. Gagnon & G. P. Lewis
 Erythrostemon caladenia (Standl.) E. Gagnon & G. P. Lewis

 Erythrostemon calycinus (Benth.) L. P. Queiroz
 Erythrostemon caudatus (A. Gray) E. Gagnon & G. P. Lewis—Tailed nicker
 Erythrostemon coccineus (G. P. Lewis & J. L. Contr.) E. Gagnon & G. P. Lewis
 Erythrostemon coluteifolius (Griseb.) E. Gagnon & G. P. Lewis
 Erythrostemon coulterioides (Griseb. emend. Burkart) E. Gagnon & G. P. Lewis
 Erythrostemon epifanioi (J. L. Contr.) E. Gagnon & G. P. Lewis
 Erythrostemon exilifolius (Griseb.) E. Gagnon & G. P. Lewis
 Erythrostemon exostemma (DC.) E. Gagnon & G. P. Lewis
 subsp. exostemma (DC.) E. Gagnon & G. P. Lewis
 subsp. tampicoanus (Britton & Rose) E. Gagnon & G. P. Lewis
 Erythrostemon fimbriatus (Tul.) E. Gagnon & G. P. Lewis
 Erythrostemon gilliesii (Hook.) Klotzsch—Bird of paradise
 Erythrostemon glandulosus (Bertero ex DC.) E. Gagnon & G. P. Lewis
 Erythrostemon hintonii (Sandwith) E. Gagnon & G. P. Lewis
 Erythrostemon hughesii (G. P. Lewis) E. Gagnon & G. P. Lewis
 Erythrostemon laxus (Benth.) E. Gagnon & G. P. Lewis
 Erythrostemon macvaughii (J. L. Contr. & G. P. Lewis) E. Gagnon & G. P. Lewis
 Erythrostemon melanadenius (Rose) E. Gagnon & G. P. Lewis
 Erythrostemon mexicanus (A. Gray) E. Gagnon & G. P. Lewis—Mexican holdback (southernmost Texas, Mexico)
 Erythrostemon nelsonii (Britton & Rose) E. Gagnon & G. P. Lewis
 Erythrostemon nicaraguensis (G. P. Lewis) E. Gagnon & G. P. Lewis
 Erythrostemon oyamae (Sotuyo & G. P. Lewis) E. Gagnon & G. P. Lewis
 Erythrostemon palmeri (S. Watson) E. Gagnon & G. P. Lewis
 Erythrostemon pannosus (Brandegee) E. Gagnon & G. P. Lewis
 Erythrostemon phyllanthoides (Standl.) E. Gagnon & G. P. Lewis—Wait-a-bit vine
 Erythrostemon placidus (Brandegee) E. Gagnon & G. P. Lewis
 Erythrostemon robinsonianus (Britton & Rose) E. Gagnon & G. P. Lewis
 Erythrostemon standleyi (Britton & Rose) E. Gagnon & G. P. Lewis
 Erythrostemon yucatanensis (Greenm.) E. Gagnon & G. P. Lewis
 subsp. chiapensis (G. P. Lewis) E. Gagnon & G. P. Lewis
 subsp. hondurensis (G. P. Lewis) E. Gagnon & G. P. Lewis
 subsp. yucatanensis (Greenm.) E. Gagnon & G. P. Lewis

References

External links

Caesalpinieae
Fabaceae genera